Ulrike Schaede is Professor of Japanese Business at the School of Global Policy and Strategy (GPS) at the University of California, San Diego. She is a leading scholar of Japanese business, management, and the Japanese economy, and specializes in Japanese business organization, employment practices and management strategies, Japan's industrial groups and political economy, antitrust, financial system and corporate governance, entrepreneurship and innovation. She is the Founding Director of the Japan Forum for Innovation and Technology (JFIT) and head of the International Management track at GPS. She has written seven books and over 50 articles on Japanese corporate strategy, business and management. Her current interest is the changing business models of large Japanese companies and their pursuit of an “aggregate niche strategy” – a concept she developed in her 2020 book “The Business Reinvention of Japan” (Stanford Business Books). She is a Fellow at the Mitsubishi Research Institute and advisor to the Innovation Network for Co-Creating the Future (INCF), as well as to the Life Science Innovation Network Japan (LINK-J).

Her website is www.thejapanologist.com, where she writes blogs about current events in Japan, mostly with a business connection. She is the host of Japan Forum Webinars, a weekly JFIT webinar series that invites experts and opinion leaders on Japan for weekly discussions of current events in Japan, Asia, and the world.

In 1991, Schaede was awarded the OAG Prize, for the best book written on Japan in 1990-1991, by t he Ostasiatische Gesellschaft Tokyo.

Background
Schaede received her Ph.D. in Japanese Studies/Economics (1989) from University of Marburg, Germany and an M.A. in Japanese Studies/Economics (1987) and a Translator's Diploma in Japanese (1985) from University of Bonn, Germany. Schaede is trilingual (German, English, and Japanese). She has lived in Tokyo, Japan for a total of more than nine years. She has been invited as a visiting professor to Hitotsubashi University in Tokyo, the Haas Business School at UC Berkeley, and the Harvard Business School. She has been a visiting scholar at the research institutes of the Bank of Japan, Japan's Ministry of Finance, Japan's Ministry of Economy, Trade and Industry, and the Development Bank of Japan. She has served on the academic advisory boards of the German Institute for Japanese Studies (DIJ, Max-Weber-Stiftung) in Tokyo, and the IN-EAST program at the University of Duisburg-Essen in Germany.

Books
 
  (in Japanese)
 
 
 
  (in German).
  (in German)

References

External links
Ulrike Schaede at the University of California, San Diego (UCSD), School of Global Policy and Strategy
Director's message from Schaede, Japan Forum for Innovation and Technology (JFIT UCSD)
The Japanologist

University of California, San Diego faculty
1962 births
Living people
American women political scientists
American political scientists
21st-century American women